Rural Hall Plantation House is a historic plantation house located near Georgetown, Georgetown County, South Carolina. It was built about 1850, and is a two-story, five bay, frame dwelling. It features a porch across the main façade facing the river, and an identical porch on the opposite (land) side, which is visible from the road.

It was listed on the National Register of Historic Places in 1988.

References

Plantation houses in South Carolina
Houses on the National Register of Historic Places in South Carolina
Houses completed in 1850
National Register of Historic Places in Georgetown County, South Carolina
Houses in Georgetown County, South Carolina